Salvador Gabriel Gómez-Colón (born 2002) is a youth activist from Puerto Rico. After Hurricane Maria struck his home island of Puerto Rico in 2017, Gómez-Colón founded the humanitarian initiative Light and Hope for Puerto Rico. He is also the author of Hurricane: My Story of Resilience.

Early life 
Gómez-Colón was born in 2002. He was raised in San Juan, Puerto Rico, and attended Saint John's School until 2018 and left to Phillips Academy in Andover, Massachusetts.  During his senior year, he served as one of the student body co-presidents.

After the hurricane in September 2017, Gómez-Colón launched a crowd funding campaign called "Light and Hope for Puerto Rico." Starting in November of 2017, he raised funds and delivered solar lamps and hand-operated washing machines to the affected communities through his campaign. Light and Hope for Puerto Rico raised over $170,000 and distributed 4,100 lamps to over 3,500 households across the island.

Davos 2020 
In January 2020, Gómez-Colón attended the annual meeting of World Economic Forum in Davos, Switzerland. He spoke along with Greta Thunberg, Natasha Mwansa, and Autumn Peltier on a panel named Forging a Sustainable Path to a Common Future. Gómez-Colón was named one of the inaugural teenage change-makers at the annual meeting.

In popular culture 
Gómez-Colón is featured on Marvel's Hero Project, in the episode "Superior Salvador" of Season 1.

Honors and awards 
Gómez-Colón was named one of "The 30 Most Influential Teens of 2017" by Time magazine. 
In 2019, Gómez-Colón received the Diana Award for his humanitarian work.

Publications 
Gómez-Colón has published opinion editorials for various media, including Time magazine, The Independent, and CNN Business. His book Hurricane: My Story of Resilience was published by Norton Young Readers in October 2021.

References 

2002 births
Phillips Academy alumni
Puerto Rican activists
Living people